Eoophyla hauensteini is a moth in the family Crambidae. It was described by Speidel and Mey in 1999. It is found in the Philippines (Luzon).

References

Eoophyla
Moths described in 1999